Crichope Linn or Crichop Linn, originally Creehope is a gorge and waterfall near Gatelawbridge in Dumfries and Galloway, southern Scotland. Linn is the Scots language word for waterfall. The etymology of the names 'Cree' or 'Crich'  may derive from Gaelic for 'Boundary' and 'Hope' from the Scots for 'a valley among hills,' an apt description.

The Glen and linn
The gorge was long believed to harbour supernatural beings, and a natural rock cell, the "Elf's Kirk" (long since broken up for building stone), stood at its entrance where elves, the supernatural inhabitants of the linn were once said to congregate. A natural archway on the footpath along the side of the gorge bears many 18th and 19th century inscriptions, supposedly including one by Robert Burns.

The Ordnance Survey gives a few place names such as the 'Souter's Seat' and 'Burley's Leap' near by. Hell's Cauldron lies below the falls. The 'Gullet Spout' is marked further up the glen.

Once entered via a stone arch the glen in the 19th century had an extensive path network with several bridges crossing over the Crichope Burn at convenient places or where the view was most spectacular such as at 'Burley's Leap'. The red sandstone abutments of one of the bridges still lie in the Crichope Burn before the red sandstone gorge is reached. The paths are no longer maintained and in several places the route is hazardous.

Covenanters
In the 17th century, Covenanters used Crichope Linn as a hiding place and a natural seat in the form of a chair acquired the name 'Sutors Seat' after a shoemaker who once hid here. Probably as a result of a visit to the linn, Walter Scott is said to have been charmed by it and chose it as the lair of John Balfour of Burleigh in Old Mortality.

Eminent visitors
Sir Walter Scott had explored the glen whilst visiting his brother who was taught at the near by Wallace Hall School in Closeburn and mentioned the graffiti left by some of the many visitors. The glen inspired a local poet, the Rev. William Haining, in the early 1900s :

The famous author Thomas Carlyle made many visits, living in the area at Craigenputtock House for several years and marrying Jane Welsh at Templand Farm near Dalgarnock. He wrote some verses describing the genius loci of the glen :

{| cellpadding=10 border="0" align=center
|-
| bgcolor=#f4f4f4|
"Cloistered vault of living rocks,
Here have I my darksome dwelling,
Working, sing to stones and stocks;
Where beneath my waves go welling.

Beams flood-borne athwart me cast
Arches see, and aisles moist gleaming;
Sounds for aye my organ blast,Grim cathedral, shaped in dreaming. 
|}

Robert Forsyth published his popular five volume work "Beauties of Scotland" in 1805 in which, following his visit, he describes the "..very beautiful cascade by falling over a precipice of about 80 to 90 feet in height and perpendicular.''"

Robert Burns who knew the area well as a local and as a customs and excise officer, lived for a time at near by Ellisland Farm and is said to have carved his initials here.

See also

Cleeves Cove

References

External links
Video 'Crichope Linn - Sir Walter Scott, Elves and Covenanters
Video 'Crichope Linn - Devil's Cauldron, Burley's Leap and the Souter's Seat.
Video footage of abseiling in Crichope Linn

Landforms of Dumfries and Galloway
Canyons and gorges of Scotland
Waterfalls of Dumfries and Galloway
Robert Burns